Pine Meadow is a neighborhood in southwestern Lexington, Kentucky, United States. Its boundaries are Mason Headley Road to the west, Pine Meadow Park to the north, Addison Park to the east, and the Campbell House golfcourse to the south.

Neighborhood statistics
 Area: 
 Population: 842
 Population density: 3,850 people per square mile
 Median household income: $25,684

External links
 http://www.city-data.com/neighborhood/Pine-Meadow-Lexington-KY.html

Neighborhoods in Lexington, Kentucky